Health information-seeking behaviour (HISB), also known as health information seeking, health seeking behaviour or health information behaviour, refers to a series interaction that reduce uncertainty regarding health status, but also to construct a social and personal sense of health. HISB is a key strategy for many people to understand their health problems and to cope with illness. Recently, thanks to the development of the technologies and networks, people have a trend of seeking health information on the Internet. Particularly, when it comes to the following scenarios, people tend to carry out online HISB:

 Encountering health issues
 Received conflicting information
 The cause is relevant to known people (such as family members and friends)
 Out of curiosity

See also
Health literacy

References

Health care
Information theory
Health informatics
Patient advocacy